The tournament which will be held for qualification process for the 2015 FIVB Volleyball Women's World Cup in Japan. The tournament will be played from June 1 to June 7 in Comodoro Rivadavia, Argentina. The top two teams will qualify for the 2015 FIVB Volleyball Women's World Cup.

Participated teams

 (host)

Venues

Pool standing procedure
 Numbers of matches won
 Match points
 Sets ratio
 Points ratio
 Result of the last match between the tied teams

Match won 3–0 or 3–1: 3 match points for the winner, 0 match points for the loser
Match won 3–2: 2 match points for the winner, 1 match point for the loser

Results
All times are ART (UTC−03:00).

|}

|}

Final standing

Awards

Most Valuable Player
  Yamila Nizetich
Best Setter
  Zoila La Rosa
Best Outside Spiker
  Maguilaura Frias
  LucÍa Guigou

Best Middle Blocker
  Emilce Sosa
  Yeisy Soto
Best Opposite Spiker
  Ángela Leyva
Best Libero
  Tatiana Rizzo

See also
2015 FIVB Volleyball Men's World Cup – South American Qualification

References

Qualification
South American
Volleyball
International volleyball competitions hosted by Argentina